Mário Ribeiro (7 April 1935 – 27 July 2021) was a Portuguese sports shooter. He competed in two events at the 1972 Summer Olympics.

References

External links
 

1935 births
2021 deaths
Portuguese male sport shooters
Olympic shooters of Portugal
Shooters at the 1972 Summer Olympics
Place of birth missing